Moschianus may refer to:

 Moschianus (consul 512), Flavius Moschianus (fl. 512), politician of the Eastern Roman Empire
 Anastasius Paulus Probus Moschianus Probus Magnus, consul in 518